Appuleius is the nomen of the Roman gens Appuleia.  It may refer to various members of that family, including:

 Lucius Appuleius Saturninus, tribune of the plebs in 100 B.C.
Lucius Caecilicus Minutianus Appuleius, ancient Roman writer on grammar
 Any of several individuals named Sextus Appuleius.
 Lucius Appuleius, author of The Golden Ass.

For other persons named Appuleius, see Appuleia (gens).

See also
 Gens
 List of Roman gentes

Appuleii
Ancient Roman prosopographical lists
Ancient Roman nomina